The following is a list of trucks produced by Mercedes-Benz.

1926–1944 
The first Mercedes-Benz truck range, presented at the 1926 Berlin Motor Show (October) and at the 1927 International Motor Show for Trucks and Special Vehicles in Cologne (May) included three basic models with the payloads of 1.5, 2.5 and 5 tons. Each model was available with a standard and a low-frame chassis. Low chassis made sense especially that time to make easier loading and unloading of the vehicle. Also the low chassis has been used to build the buses. The models with the standard chassis were L1, L2 and L5 (L stood for Lastwagen, German word for a truck, and the digit stood for the rated payload in tons). The models with the low chassis were N1, N2 and NJ5/N5 (N stood for Niederwagen, German word means a low car). The trucks were equipped with the 4 cylinders petrol engines (M14, M2 and M5), developing 45HP, 55HP and 70 HP. Mercedes-Benz L1 and L2 were the new models, but Mercedes-Benz L5 truck was basically a continuation of famous Benz 5CN truck, which was developed before the merge of Benz & Cie and Daimler-Motoren-Gesellschaft companies.

In 1927 Mercedes-Benz presented its first diesel engine (OM5), which immediately became a sensation. It was the world's first six-cylinder diesel engine, installed on the commercial vehicle. Also from 1927 Mercedes-Benz offered the more powerful 6 cylinders petrol engines (M16, M26 and M36) developing 50HP, 70HP and 100 HP. Four cylinders engines were discontinued only one year later. Therefore, in 1927–1928 most of the trucks from the series L1, L2, L5 were available with 4 or 6 cylinder engines. To distinguish that, 6 cylinders versions of the trucks were referred sometimes as, for example, L1/6 or N2/6.

In 1927–1928 Mercedes-Benz also expanded the range of the truck models, adding the small model L3/4 with the payload of 750 kg (3/4 ton), which was developed from the passenger car Typ 200 Nürnberg, and a heavy three axis model N56 with the payload 7-9 tons. The payloads of L1 and L2 models was increased with the new 6 cylinder engines from 1.5 to 1.75 tons (model L1/N1) and from 2.5 to 3.0-4.0 tons (model L2/N2). To fill the newly formed gap between L1 and L2 models, Mercedes-Benz offered new 2.5 tons model L45/N46 and (a bit later) 2.75/3.0 tons model L57/N58.

Resulting diversity of the trucks made an impressive lineup of Mercedes-Benz commercial vehicles, but also required a new, better system for their designations. In fact, by the year of 1930, only the model L5 still referred to its payload (5 tons). L1 model's payload has been gradually increased up to 2 tons, L2 model's payload - up to 4 tons, and L45/N46 and L57/N58 model names were not saying about their payload at all from the beginning, but were rather the company's internal model designations. So in October 1930 a new system for the commercial vehicle designation has been introduced. Basically, instead of the one digit, standing for the rated payload in tons, a four digits number, standing for the rated payload in kg, has now been used. This number followed the same letter L for the trucks (as before), or the letters Lo (LO) for the low chassis, or the letter O for the buses (O stood for the German word Omnibus, what is translated as a bus). According to that, the model L1 was renamed to L2000, model L45 was renamed to L2500, model L57 was renamed to L3000, model L2 was renamed to L4000, model L5 was renamed to L5000 and the model N56 was renamed to L8500. This nomenclature has been used for more than 20 years, until 1954.

L1, L2, and L5 (19261932)

1st generation, with the 4 cylinder engines (19261929)

2nd generation, with the 6 cylinder engines (19271931)

3rd generation (19301932)

L3/4 and L1000 Express (19271936)

Light trucks (19321941)

1st generation (19321935)

2nd generation (19351937)

3rd generation (19371941)

Semitrailer tractors (19321938) 
Mercedes-Benz semitrailer tractor family was developed from Mercedes-Benz Lo2000-Lo3750 trucks.

L5000 (1932–1936)

Heavy-duty trucks (19341939)

LG and LR  (19341944) 
LG means Lastwagen Gelandewagen (off-road truck). LR means Lastwagen Raupenfahrzeug (caterpillar truck).

Mercedes-Benz LG65/2 and LG65/4 were experimental models.

L1100, L1500, and L2000 (19361941)

L1500, L3000, and L4500 (19391944)

1945–1960 
The immediate post-war era was marked by rebuilding the trucking industry. In the mid-fifties, however, Germany's first federal transport minister Hans-Christoph Seebohm enacted a number of laws promoting the Bundesbahn at the expense of the trucking industry. Severe weight and dimension restrictions were particularly harmful to export-dependent Mercedes-Benz, as they had to develop duplicate truck lineups - one for export, and one for the restricted German market. These restrictions were eased beginning in 1960, leaving Mercedes-Benz free to focus their efforts on a unified lineup once again.

L4500 (19451961)

L3500/L4500 (19491961)

L6600 (19501962) 

The nomenclature: In 1954 the old four-digit model series designation (indicated the payload in kilograms), was replaced by a three-digit model series designation, which basically corresponded to Mercedes-Benz internal model designations (in-house design codes). This nomenclature have been used for almost 10 years, from 1954 till 1963.

A cab-over-engine versions of most of the trucks were also available from 1954. For example,  LP4500 (1954) and LP315 (1955). However, there was only a single model which existed only as a cab-over-engine version, "the Millipede" (LP 333).

1960s

Kurzhauber (1959–1988) 
Cab-over-engine versions (LP) of most of the trucks were also available; the cabins were built by Wackenhut until the introduction of the "cubic" cab LP-series.

1st generation (OM312, OM321, OM322 engines), 19591963

2nd generation (OM352 engine), 19631970

The nomenclature: In 1963 for simplification a new index system was introduced: a four-digit model series designation, where the first one or two first digits indicate the rounded GVW in tones, and the last two figures - the engine power to tens of horsepower. This index system is in use until now.

3rd generation (OM352 and OM 360 engines), 19671988

LP versions - see below.

Kurzhauber with longer hood (1959-1988) 
The cab-over-engine versions (LP) of most of the trucks were also available.

1st generation (OM326 engine), 19591963

2nd generation (OM346 engine), 1963–1970

3rd generation (OM355 engine), 19671988
LP versions - see below.

 Mercedes-Benz LP-series (cubic)

Light range trucks (19651984)

Medium range trucks (19651976)

Heavy range trucks (19631977)

1970–1980s

New Generation (1974–1988)

1st generation (NG74)

2nd and 3rd generations (NG80, 19801985 and NG85, 19851988)

1990s 

 Mercedes-Benz SK (Schwere Klasse)
 Mercedes-Benz MB700 (coe)
 Mercedes-Benz MB800 (Built by Mercedes-Benz Türk since 1996, this five-ton cab-over truck uses an Indonesian cabin, a Brazilian engine, and a Spanish transmission)

2000s 

 Mercedes-Benz Atego - light truck from 7 to 16 tonnes
 Mercedes-Benz Axor - mid-sized truck from 18 to 26 tonnes in rigid and articulated
 Mercedes-Benz Actros - heavy duty rigid and premium articulated — 18 to 25 tonnes
  Mercedes-Benz Atron
 Mercedes-Benz Econic - low floor version of the Axor for refuse and specialist applications
 Mercedes-Benz Unimog - for special purpose applications and transport across extreme terrain
 Mercedes-Benz Zetros - off-road truck for extreme operations
 1828L (F581) Mobile Casualty Treatment Centre
 1517L Mobile Casualty Treatment Centre
 Mercedes-Benz Arocs
 Mercedes-Benz Antos 
2013

Mercedes-Benz internal model designations (in-house design codes) were always more or less just consecutively allocated design codes devoid of any deeper meaning. For the passenger cars they are so-called W-numbers, from German word Wagen (=car). For example, W202 is C-class, W220 is S-class etc. This system started in 1926 and the numbers are consecutive continued till now. From the 1970s letter W is used for saloons, while the other letters have been add for the different body types (f.e. W212 is E-class saloon, V212 is E-class limousine, S212 is E-class estate etc.). For the commercial vehicles for early decades letter L was used instead of letter W (German word Lastwagen means a truck). From the 1950s letter L was omitted, resulting in just 3 numbers code. Sometimes word Baumuster (model) or Baureihe (model line) was used, like Baumuster 352 (or in short BM352) or Baureihe 352 (in short BR.352). So, basically, with or without a letter(s) in front, there is unique 3-number code, which determine every Mercedes-Benz car. As for the trucks, 300-i.e. numbers were used till the 1980s to code Mercedes commercial vehicles, 600-i.e. numbers were used in the 1980s and 1990s, and 900-i.e. numbers have been used from the introduction of Sprinter (1995) and Actros (1996).

In 2011 the internal model designations system was a little bit reorganized:

 Division. 
 9: Commercial vehicle
 Generation
 6: Actros/Antos/Arocs/Atego
 56: Econic
 Project
 3: Actros/Antos On-road
 4: Arocs Off-road
 7: Atego
 Kind of vehicle
 0: Rigid
 2: Dumper
 3: Concrete mixer
 Tractor
 Axle configuration/tonnage/rear suspension

For example: 963403 means Commercial Actros/Antos concrete mixer On-road vehicle, 4x2 18t

Timeline

References

Notes

Bibliography

 
 }

External links
 1928 Mercedes-Benz commercial vehicles lineup
 1931 Mercedes-Benz commercial vehicles lineup
 1938 Mercedes-Benz commercial vehicles lineup

 
 
Truck-related lists